James Henley Thornwell (December 9, 1812 – August 1, 1862) was an American Presbyterian preacher, slaveowner, and religious writer from the U.S. state of South Carolina during the 19th century. During the American Civil War, Thornwell supported the Confederacy and preached a doctrine that claimed slavery to be morally right and justified by the tenets of Christianity. But contrary to many proponents of slavery, he preached that the African American population were people created in the image of God just like whites and that they should call slaves their brothers. He became prominent in the Old School Presbyterian denomination in the south, preaching and writing on theological and social issues. He taught at South Carolina College, eventually served as its president, and went on to teach at Columbia Theological Seminary. He was a contemporary of Charles Hodge and represented the southern branch of the Presbyterian church in debates on ecclesiology with Hodge.

Career
When the American Civil War broke out, Thornwell supported the Confederacy. He founded the Southern Presbyterian Review, edited the Southern Quarterly Review, and had a prominent role in establishing the Presbyterian Church in the Confederacy. Thornwell preached the first sermon and wrote the first address for the new denomination.

As a supporter of the Confederacy, Thornwell held the view that slavery was morally right and justified under the Christian religion. He accused those who viewed slavery as being morally wrong, namely the Republicans, as being opposed to Christianity:

Death
Thornwell died on August 1, 1862, after a long struggle with tuberculosis.  Thornwell is buried in Elmwood Cemetery, Columbia, Richland County, South Carolina.

Legacy
An administrative building at University of South Carolina is named in his honor. In July 2021, the university's Presidential Commission on University History recommended removing his name from the building.

Thornwell, in the words of Professor Eugene Genovese, attempted "to envision a Christian society that could reconcile – so far as possible in a world haunted by evil – the conflicting claims of a social order with social justice and both with the freedom and dignity of the individual."

Thornwell believed in a collectivist vision of society in which all individuals were connected with each other and with God. 

Thornwell owned slaves. He constantly cited the Bible to argue against abolitionists that slavery was sanctioned by Biblical authority. Being an orphan himself, Thornwell considered slaves should be treated with loving care and paternalistic guidance. He advocated a limited slavery which was humane and in line with God's precepts. This was because Thornwell thought free labor left the poor in a state of misery and threatened society with revolution and upheaval. Therefore, he believed a reformed and more Christian version of slavery to be a preferable alternative. Thornwell's disdain for the absolute power of slave masters and subsequent attempts to reconcile Christianity, paternalism, and slavery produced a vision for society which some historians have described as fascist.

See also

Robert Lewis Dabney

References

Bibliography
 Thornwell, James Henley. The Collected Writings of James Henley Thornwell, 4 vols. Edited by John B. Adger and John L. Girardeau, 1871–1873.
  Thornwell, James Henley. The Rights and Duties of Masters: A Sermon Preached at the Dedication of a Church Erected in Charleston, S. C., for the Benefit and Instruction of the Coloured Population (1850).
 Palmer, B.M. The Life and Letters of James Henley Thornwell, 1875. online reprint
 Calhoun, David B. Our Southern Zion – Old Columbia Seminary 1828–1927 published by Banner of Truth Trust, Carlisle PA 17018 USA, Copyright David B. Calhoun, 2012. 
 White, Henry Alexandra. Southern Presbyterian Leaders 1683–1911 published by Banner of Truth Trust, Carlisle, PA 17018 USA, 2000. Previously published by the Neale Publishing Co., New York, 1911.

Further reading
  James Henley Thornwell and the Theological Defense of Slavery (1851–54) by Erik Grayson, History and Religious Studies Major, University of South Carolina.  Vimeo video (10:01 minutes). A pdf of the text is available here.

External links
  The Collected Writings of James Henley Thornwell, Volume 1——Theological. (678 pdfs)
  The Collected Writings of James Henley Thornwell, Volume 2——Theological and Ethical.  (634 pdfs)
  The Collected Writings of James Henley Thornwell, Volume 3——Theological and Controversial.  (830 pdfs)
  The Collected Writings of James Henley Thornwell, Volume 4——Ecclesiastical.  (648 pdfs)
  The Rights and Duties of Masters: A Sermon ... by James Henley Thornwell.  (1850, 56 pdfs)
  The State of the Country: The Causes which brought about the secession of South Carolina from the Union. An article republished from the Southern Presbyterian Review. ( This work is the property of the University of North Carolina at Chapel Hill. It may be used freely by individuals for research, teaching and personal use as long as this statement of availability is included in the text).
 

1812 births
1862 deaths
Presbyterian Church in the United States of America ministers
American proslavery activists
American religious writers
American Calvinist and Reformed theologians
Burials in South Carolina
Columbia Theological Seminary faculty
Harvard University alumni
Tuberculosis deaths in South Carolina
People from Marlboro County, South Carolina
Presidents of the University of South Carolina
19th-century Presbyterians
19th-century Calvinist and Reformed theologians
Presbyterian Church in the United States members
19th-century deaths from tuberculosis
19th-century American clergy